Katrin Zeller (born 1 March 1979 in Oberstdorf, Bavaria, West Germany) is a German cross-country skier who competed between 1997 and 2014. She won a silver medal in the 4 × 5 km relay at the 2010 Winter Olympics in Vancouver, Canada.

Zeller also won a silver medal in the 4 × 5 km relay at the FIS Nordic World Ski Championships 2009 in Liberec. Her best individual finish at the championships was 17th in the 7.5 km + 7.5 km double pursuit at those same championships.

Her best individual World Cup finish was third in a 10 km event at Lahti in 2008. She has seven total victories at various levels in her career from 2003 to 2008.

Cross-country skiing results
All results are sourced from the International Ski Federation (FIS).

Olympic Games
 1 medal – (1 silver)

World Championships
 1 medal – (1 silver)

World Cup

Season standings

Individual podiums

1 podium

Team podiums

 6 podiums – (5 , 1 )

References

External links

 
 
 

1979 births
Living people
People from Oberstdorf
Sportspeople from Swabia (Bavaria)
Cross-country skiers at the 2010 Winter Olympics
Cross-country skiers at the 2014 Winter Olympics
German female cross-country skiers
Tour de Ski skiers
Olympic cross-country skiers of Germany
Olympic silver medalists for Germany
Olympic medalists in cross-country skiing
FIS Nordic World Ski Championships medalists in cross-country skiing
Medalists at the 2010 Winter Olympics